Start Over On Monday is the debut album by Buffalo-based band This Day & Age, released in summer 2002.

Track listing

 Wallis (Trying Not to Try) - 3:13
 A Witness to Your Fading Integrity - 5:24
 The Struggle - 4:36
 All That Can Change - 3:17
 Looking for Answers - 3:49
 Sunset - 4:04
 Three Weeks from Now - 4:08
 The Best Goodbye - 4:14
 When Summer's Gone - 3:45
 Learning to Forget - 11:23

Start Over on Monday